Bracadale is a settlement and parish on the Isle of Skye in Scotland. It lies on the west coast of the island, west-south-west of Portree, on Loch Beag, an inlet off Loch Harport. Nearby settlements include Struan to the west and Coillore on the opposite shore of Loch Beag.

The name could derive from the Old Norse for "juniper dale" or "bracken dale"; or from the Scottish Gaelic breac and dail, meaning "spotted valley", or "valley of the trout/salmon".

See also
 Loch Bracadale
 Alastair Campbell, Lord Bracadale - Scottish judge

 Roderick McLeod (minister) minister suspended in the Bracadale Case. Not to be confused with his namesake who wrote the Statistical Account for Bracadale

References

Populated places in the Isle of Skye